Vanderbilt is a village in Otsego County in the U.S. state of Michigan. The population was 498 at the 2020 census. The village is located within Corwith Township.

Vanderbilt holds the record for the coldest recorded temperature in the state of Michigan when it reached  on February 9, 1934.

History
The area was first settled as early as 1875 when a railway belonging to the Michigan Central Railroad was planned to extend north from Gaylord.  The settlement was named after Cornelius Vanderbilt, who owned land within Corwith Township.  The railway reached Vanderbilt by 1881.

The village was incorporated in 1901.

Geography

Major highways
 runs north–south through the western edge of the village and is accessible via exit 290 (Mill Street).

Climate
This climatic region is typified by large seasonal temperature differences, with warm to hot (and often humid) summers and cold (sometimes severely cold) winters.  According to the Köppen Climate Classification system, Vanderbilt has a humid continental climate, abbreviated "Dfb" on climate maps.

On July 13, 1936, the highest temperature recorded in Michigan was in Mio, one county southeast, which reached .

Education
The village of Vanderbilt contains its own school district, Vanderbilt Area Schools, which also serves a much larger area that includes all of Corwith Township, as well as small portions of several adjacent townships.

Demographics

2010 census
As of the census of 2010, there were 562 people, 237 households, and 145 families residing in the village. The racial makeup of the village was 95.6% White, 0.7% African American, 0.9% Native American, and 2.8% from two or more races. Hispanic or Latino of any race were 0.9% of the population.

There were 237 households, of which 26.6% had children under the age of 18 living with them, 45.6% were married couples living together, 13.1% had a female householder with no husband present, 2.5% had a male householder with no wife present, and 38.8% were non-families. 33.3% of all households were made up of individuals, and 14.4% had someone living alone who was 65 years of age or older. The average household size was 2.37 and the average family size was 3.01.

The median age in the village was 44 years. 21.7% of residents were under the age of 18; 7.9% were between the ages of 18 and 24; 21.9% were from 25 to 44; 30.3% were from 45 to 64; and 18.1% were 65 years of age or older. The gender makeup of the village was 48.8% male and 51.2% female.

2000 census
As of the census of 2000, there were 587 people, 241 households, and 148 families residing in the village. The racial makeup of the village was 97.79% White, 0.17% African American, 1.70% Native American, and 0.34% from two or more races.

There were 241 households, out of which 29.0% had children under the age of 18 living with them, 46.5% were married couples living together, 10.0% had a female householder with no husband present, and 38.2% were non-families. 33.6% of all households were made up of individuals, and 14.9% had someone living alone who was 65 years of age or older. The average household size was 2.44 and the average family size was 3.09.

In the village, the population was spread out, with 25.7% under the age of 18, 10.6% from 18 to 24, 28.8% from 25 to 44, 20.1% from 45 to 64, and 14.8% who were 65 years of age or older. The median age was 36 years. For every 100 females, there were 98.3 males. For every 100 females age 18 and over, there were 96.4 males.

The median income for a household in the village was $27,969, and the median income for a family was $37,857. Males had a median income of $25,000 versus $19,875 for females. The per capita income for the village was $11,973. None of the families and 6.8% of the population were living below the poverty line, including no under eighteens and 8.9% of those over 64.

Images

References

Vanderbilt family
Villages in Otsego County, Michigan
Villages in Michigan
Populated places established in 1875
1875 establishments in Michigan